This is the list of the number ones of the UK Compilation Chart during the 2020s.

Number ones

References

External links
Compilation Albums Top 40 at the Official Charts Company
The Official UK Compilation Chart at MTV
UK Top 40 Compilation Albums at BBC Radio 1

2020s in British music
United Kingdom Compilation Albums
Compilation 2020s